Manu Vunipola (born 4 May 2000) is a rugby union fly-half for Saracens in Premiership Rugby. Born in New Zealand, he has represented England under-18s and England under-20s.

Personal life
Vunipola was born in Auckland, New Zealand, and grew up in Somerset, England. He is the son of former Tongan international Elisi Vunipola, and the cousin of Saracens teammates Billy and Mako Vunipola. He attended The King Alfred School, Highbridge. As a junior, he played for Burnham RFC, and captained the Harrow School rugby team.

Career

Club career

In 2017, Vunipola played for Saracens under-18s in the Aviva Premiership under-18s finals day. Vunipola then played for Saracens Storm, the A team of Saracens, and also played on loan for Bishop's Stortford. Vunipola made his Saracens debut in January 2019, in a 2018–19 Premiership Rugby Cup match against Harlequins. He made his Premiership Rugby debut in a 2018–19 match against Exeter Chiefs, and later made his first Premiership Rugby start in a match against Worcester Warriors.

In September 2019, Vunipola scored his first try for Saracens in a 2019–20 Premiership Rugby match against Wasps. In January 2020, Vunipola scored 17 points in a 2019–20 European Rugby Champions Cup pool stage match, as Saracens beat Ospreys 22–15. In the same month, referee Luke Pearce appointed Vunipola as Saracens captain, after Pearce decided he did not want to speak with Jackson Wray during a match against Harlequins. In a February 2020 Premiership Rugby match against Sale, Vunipola scored 17 points and won a man of the match award.

He has re-signed with Saracens until at least the 2022–23 season.

International career

In 2018, Vunipola was called up to the England under-18s team. In total, he made four appearances for the team. Vunipola made his first start for England under-20s in their final match of the 2019 Six Nations Under 20s Championship against Scotland under-20s. He had made two previous substitute appearances in the tournament. He was selected for the 2019 World Rugby Under 20 Championship in Argentina, and also for the 2020 Six Nations Under 20s Championship. He played in the Six Nations match against France under-20s in Grenoble, but missed the match against Ireland under-20s after returning to Tonga for personal reasons. As of February 2020, he has made nine appearances for England under-20s.

References

External links
 Saracens profile

2000 births
Living people
English people of Tongan descent
English rugby union players
New Zealand emigrants to England
New Zealand sportspeople of Tongan descent
New Zealand rugby union players
Rugby union fly-halves
Rugby union players from Auckland
Saracens F.C. players
Rugby union players from Somerset
People educated at Harrow School